The Old Gay Hill Red China is a rose native to Gay Hill, Washington County, Texas.

History
The rose was discovered by Thomas Affleck (1812-1868), a Scottish immigrant, nurseryman, agrarian writer and plantation owner, on his Glenblythe Plantation.

Description
It is a bright scarlet red, with a white center. It is grows in clusters on a rosebush, which is four to six feet tall.

References

Endemic flora of Texas
Rose cultivars